The Deutscher Turn- und Sportbund (DTSB; German Gymnastics and Sports Federation) was a mass organization of the German Democratic Republic from 1957 until shortly after German reunification. Membership in the organization included nearly four million people, which accounted for almost 20% of the population of the GDR.

History
Founded in 1957, the DTSB was the last major mass organization to be created by the East German government, and was the central agency responsible for mass sport. The federation consisted of individual sports associations within the country, ranging from sailing to chess. While it worked in conjunction with the Gesellschaft für Sport und Technik, the DTSB focused more on adult activities, whereas the GST focused on youth activities. The DTSB worked closely with both the Free German Youth and the East German Olympic Committee and had representation in all levels of East German local and state government. The DTSB was charged with both organizing and financing all sporting and fitness activities, associations, and events in the nation, as well as promoting physical education among the masses. It had especially close ties with the ruling Socialist Unity Party and was also designed to promote socialist ideology through sport.

Upon the dissolution of East Germany and reunification with the West, the organization was deprived of funds and the individual sports associations either continued to exist independently or joined their Western counterparts. The DTSB eventually dissolved itself on 5 December 1990.

Sports Associations of the DTSB

Presidents of the DTSB

See also
Sports associations (East Germany)
National Front (East Germany)
Gesellschaft für Sport und Technik

References

Sports governing bodies in East Germany
Organisations based in East Germany
Mass organisations of East Germany
1957 establishments in East Germany
Organizations established in 1957